The Heidelberg Artists Trail is a self-drive, cycling and walking trail that includes a series of 57 explanatory signs and boards situated in locations frequented by artists of the Heidelberg School. The signs display reproductions and descriptions of some of the most famous paintings, and are popular with school groups who have an interest in the arts and the natural environment. The trail winds for approximately 40 km through much of Jagajaga, including the municipalities of Banyule, Nillumbik and Manningham, through to the Yarra Valley and the Dandenong Ranges.

Locations
Below is a numbered list of all the signs on the trail and works featured on them (trail length shown in brackets):

Central Heidelberg (1.5 km)
1. Charles Conder, Impressionists’ Camp, 1889
2. Walter Withers, The Last Summer, 1898
3. Walter Withers, A Bright Winter's Morning, 1894
4. Walter Withers, The Farm, 1890
5. Walter Withers, Early Morning Heidelberg, 1898
6. Walter Withers, The Storm, 1896
Eaglemont (600m)
7. Arthur Streeton, The Selector's Hut: Whelan on the Log, 1890
8. Arthur Streeton, Eaglemont, 1889
9. Walter Withers, The Yarra Below Eaglemont, 1895
East Ivanhoe (100m)
10. Emanuel Phillips Fox, A Love Story, 1903
11. Emanuel Phillips Fox, Art Students, 1895
12. Tudor St George Tucker, Young Girl in a Garden, 1895
Yarra Flats Park (3.8 km)
13. Emanuel Phillips Fox, Moonrise Heidelberg, 1900
14. Walter Withers, Chartersville near Eaglemont, Victoria, 1890
15. Arthur Streeton, Sill Glides the Stream & Shall Forever Glide, 1890
16. Arthur Streeton, Above Us the Great Grave Sky, 1890
17. Arthur Streeton, Golden Summer, Eaglemont, 1889
18. Arthur Streeton, Near Heidelberg, 1890
19. Louis Buvelot, Winter Morning near Heidelberg, 1866
20. Walter Withers, Tranquil Winter, 1895
Banksia Park (200m)
21. Arthur Streeton, Spring, 1890
22. Tom Roberts, Quiet Stream, Heidelberg, 1885
23. Charles Conder, The Yarra Heidelberg Boys Bathing, 1890
Templestowe (1.7 km)
24. David Davies, Evening at Templestowe, 1897
25. Louis Buvelot, Summer Afternoon, Templstowe, 1866
26. Arthur Streeton, The Road to Templestowe, 1889
27. David Davies, Moonrise, 1894
Warrandyte (800m)
28. Clara Southern, A Cool Corner, 1918
29. Clara Southern, Warrandyte Hotel, 1910
30. Clara Southern, Evensong, 1900
31. Walter Withers, Old Bridge, Warrnadyte
Eltham (1.5 km)
32. Walter Withers, Country Road, 1898
33. Walter Withers, Spring, 1910
34. Walter Withers, On the Eltham Road, 1906
35. Walter Withers, The Drover, 1912
36. Walter Withers, Landscape with Sheep
37. Walter Withers, The Silent Gums, 1909
Research (500m)
38. Clara Southern, An Old Bee Farm, 1900
39. Clara Southern, A Country Wash-House, 1905
40. Clara Southern, Audrey and Chickapick, 1911
41. Clara Southern, The Artist’s Home, 1909
Diamond Creek (500m)
42. May Vale, The Orchard, 1904
43. Jane Price, Moonrise
Ferntree Gully
44. Eugene Von Guerard, Ferntree Gully in the Dandenong Ranges, 1857
Kallista (200m)
45. Tom Roberts, Washing Day, Kallista, 1923
46. Tom Roberts, Country Road Makers, 1923
47. Tom Roberts, Sherbrooke Forest, 1924
Olinda (100m)
48. Arthur Streeton, Golden Afternoon, Olinda, 1924
49. Arthur Streeton, View from Farmer’s, Olinda, 1924
Mount Dandenong & Kalorama
50. Arthur Streeton, The Cloud (Storm over Macedon), 1936
51. Arthur Streeton, Observatory Road Kalorama Park looking towards Silvan, 1937
Silvan
52. Arthur Streeton, Silvan Dam, 1930
Lilydale
53. Arthur Streeton, Mitchell’s Lime Quarry, 1935
Coldstream (100m)
54. Arthur Streeton, Melba’s Farm, 1914
55. William Nicholas Rowell, Lilydale Road, 1928
Yering
56. Arthur Streeton, Chrysanthemums, 1891
Yarra Glen
57. Theodore Penleigh Boyd, The Boyd Homestead at Yarra Glen, 1910

External links
Heidelberg School Artists Trail

Heidelberg School
Hiking and bushwalking tracks in Victoria (Australia)